Adam Brodecki (born February 22, 1995) is a Swedish professional ice hockey player. He is currently playing for the JYP Jyväskylä of the Finnish Liiga.

Playing career
Brodecki made his Swedish Hockey League debut playing with Brynäs IF during the 2013–14 SHL season.

He returned for a second stint with Brynäs IF after three seasons with Växjö Lakers and Linköping HC, signing a one-year deal for the 2019–20 season on 26 August 2019. In his return, Brodecki contributed with 6 goals and 14 points in 37 games before he left the club mid-season in a trade with the Malmö Redhawks while agreeing to a two-year contract extension on 10 February 2020.

On 3 September 2021, Brodecki left the SHL after eight seasons and signed a one-year deal with Finnish Liiga club, JYP Jyväskylä.

References

External links

1995 births
Brynäs IF players
JYP Jyväskylä players
Linköping HC players
Living people
Malmö Redhawks players
Ice hockey people from Stockholm
Swedish ice hockey right wingers
Växjö Lakers players